Stictiella is a genus of sand wasps in the family Crabronidae. There are at least 14 described species in Stictiella.

Species
 Stictiella boharti Gillaspy, 1985
 Stictiella callista J. Parker, 1917
 Stictiella corniculata Mickel, 1918
 Stictiella emarginata (Cresson, 1865)
 Stictiella evansi Gillaspy, 1961
 Stictiella fergusoni R. Bohart, 1985
 Stictiella flavescens Gillaspy, 1985
 Stictiella formosa (Cresson, 1873)
 Stictiella gillaspyi R. Bohart, 1982
 Stictiella pulchella (Cresson, 1865)
 Stictiella speciosa (Cresson, 1865)
 Stictiella spinifera (Mickel, 1916)
 Stictiella tuberculata (W. Fox, 1895)
 Stictiella villegasi R. Bohart, 1982 (algodones sand wasp)

References

Further reading

 

Crabronidae